Kim Noller (November 28, 1945 – April 28, 2009) was the editor of the Mountain Enterprise, a weekly newspaper serving the Mountain Communities of the Tejon Pass and headquartered in Frazier Park, Kern County, California. He was born in Tampa, Florida, to Charles Noller and Jane Tebbets Noller, and died in Bethlehem, Georgia.

Noller was reared in Tujunga, Los Angeles County, California, where he was taught the sign-painting business by his father. He was married to Gretchen Noller in 1982, and in 1991 the couple moved to the Kern County community of Lebec, and he became active in the business community. In 2000 he formed a partnership with other businesspeople to purchase the Mountain Enterprise.

He was in that position until September 2004. His last year on the job was accomplished by way of the Internet from Bethlehem, where he had moved with his wife to be closer to his grandchildren.

References

1945 births
2009 deaths
Editors of California newspapers